KVOE-FM (101.7 FM) is a radio station broadcasting a country music format, broadcasting as "Country 101.7 FM". The station is located in Emporia, Kansas, where it is also licensed. KVOE-FM is owned by Emporia's Radio Stations, Inc.

History
KVOE-FM began broadcasting as KEGS on May 2, 1985. The "GS" in KEGS were the initials of Greg Steckline of Steckline Communications of Wichita (the first licensee). In Emporia, there was a KVOE-FM on 104.9 MHz between 1966 and 1975. But after 1975 those call letters were dropped and became available for transfer. On August 30, 1994, KEGS became the new KVOE-FM at 101.7 MHz under new owner Emporia's Radio Stations, Inc.

Awards
KVOE-FM has won numerous awards from the Kansas Association of Broadcasters. In 2005, KVOE-FM won Station of the Year. In 2011, KVOE-FM won KAB's Website of the Year. In 2010, KVOE-FM won the KAB's Tony Jewell Community Service Award. On April 17, 2012, KVOE-FM's general manager Ron Thomas, went to Las Vegas, Nevada to accept the Crystal Radio Award from the National Association of Broadcasters, one of which 10 out of 50 radio stations are awarded.

Community service
Every year, KVOE puts on a Drive for Food campaign in partnership with The Salvation Army collecting "non-perishable food items" for their food pantry. KVOE also hosts an auction over the radio for the National Teachers Hall of Fame. In 2014, KVOE partnered with Emporia State University to help defeat the school's rival, Washburn University.

Programming

Sports
KVOE-FM broadcasts surrounding area high school football and basketball games, with an "Area Coaches Corner" throughout the week. KVOE-FM also broadcasts Kansas State Wildcats football and basketball games, as well as Kansas City Chiefs football games.

References

External links

VOE-FM
Radio stations established in 1984